Montader Madjed (born 24 April 2005) is a Swedish professional footballer who plays as a winger for Hammarby IF in Allsvenskan.

Early life
Madjed was born in Jönköping, Sweden. He started playing youth football with Östers IF.

Club career

Varbergs BoIS
On 8 January 2021, Madjed was signed by Varbergs BoIS on a three-year contract. He made his first competitive appearance for the club on 4 July, being 16 years and 88 days old, in a 1–1 draw against Kalmar FF, making him the first player born in 2005 to make his debut in Allsvenskan. In total, Madjed made eight league appearances for Varberg in 2021 and 2022.

Hammarby IF
On 10 August 2022, Madjed transferred to fellow Allsvenskan club Hammarby IF for an undisclosed fee, signing a three year-contract. In 2022, he made 13 league appearances for affiliated club Hammarby TFF in Ettan, Sweden's third tier, scoring five goals, helping the side to finish 6th in the table.

In 2023, he had a flying start to his career with Hammarby's senior team. On 19 February, Madjed scored in his competitive debut for the club, coming on as a substitute in a 4–1 home win against IK Brage in Svenska Cupen. Two weeks later, on 5 March, he scored a hat-trick as a starter an 8–0 win against GIF Sundsvall, helping his side pass the group stage of the domestic cup.

International career
Madjed is eligible to represent both Sweden and Iraq. In July 2021, Madjed was selected for Sweden's U17 national team for two matches against Denmark the following month. Madjed made his debut on 7 August 2021 in a 1–0 loss to Denmark, where he was substituted in the 63rd minute. Three days later, he made his first start in a 4–2 loss against Denmark.

Career statistics

Club

References

External links
 

Living people
2005 births
People from Jönköping
Swedish footballers
Sweden youth international footballers
Swedish people of Iraqi descent
Varbergs BoIS players
Östers IF players
Hammarby Fotboll players
Hammarby Talang FF players
Allsvenskan players
Ettan Fotboll players